Chromosome X open reading frame 57 is a protein that in humans is encoded by the CXorf57 gene.

References

Further reading